Southwest Harbor is a town in Hancock County, Maine, United States. Located on Mount Desert Island, the population was 1,756 at the 2020 census. The municipality contains within it the villages of Southwest Harbor, Manset, Seawall, Wonderland, and Pemetic Hills.

Geography

Demographics

2010 census

As of the census of 2010, there were 1,764 people, 835 households, and 483 families living in the town. The racial makeup of the town was 97.3% White, 0.2% African American, 0.5% Native American, 0.3% Asian, 0.3% from other races, and 1.4% from two or more races. Hispanic or Latino of any race were 1.0% of the population.

There were 835 households, of which 24.2% had children under the age of 18 living with them, 44.2% were married couples living together, 10.1% had a female householder with no husband present, 3.6% had a male householder with no wife present, and 42.2% were non-families. 35.0% of all households were made up of individuals, and 15.7% had someone living alone who was 65 years of age or older. The average household size was 2.10 and the average family size was 2.69.

The median age in the town was 47.2 years. 19.4% of residents were under the age of 18; 7.1% were between the ages of 18 and 24; 20% were from 25 to 44; 31.3% were from 45 to 64; and 22.1% were 65 years of age or older. The gender makeup of the town was 47.0% male and 53.0% female.

2000 census

As of the census of 2000, there were 1,966 people, 899 households, and 534 families living in the town. The racial makeup of the town was 98.37% White, 0.31% African American, 0.15% Native American, 0.15% Asian, 0.31% from other races, and 0.71% from two or more races. Hispanic or Latino of any race were 0.56% of the population.

There were 899 households, out of which 24.9% had children under the age of 18 living with them, 47.9% were married couples living together, 8.3% had a female householder with no husband present, and 40.5% were non-families. Of all households 34.0% were made up of individuals, and 16.9% had someone living alone who was 65 years of age or older.  The average household size was 2.15 and the average family size was 2.76.

In the town, the population was spread out, with 20.7% under the age of 18, 7.4% from 18 to 24, 26.2% from 25 to 44, 26.0% from 45 to 64, and 19.6% who were 65 years of age or older.  The median age was 42 years. For every 100 females, there were 90.9 males.  For every 100 females age 18 and over, there were 90.7 males.

The median income for a household in the town was $36,555, and the median income for a family was $50,000. Males had a median income of $29,792 versus $24,044 for females. The per capita income for the town was $21,509.  About 8.8% of families and 12.0% of the population were below the poverty line, including 17.3% of those under age 18 and 6.3% of those age 65 or over.

Education

Southwest Harbor has one school, Pemetic Elementary School. The school educates students in kindergarten through eighth grade. The building originally housed Pemetic High School, which served Southwest Harbor and the neighboring town of Tremont. The elementary school includes two baseball fields and a soccer field. Today, high school students from Southwest Harbor and Tremont attend Mount Desert Island High School in the town of Mount Desert.

Business and industry

Hinckley Yachts maintains its headquarters, design, construction, and repair facilities in Southwest Harbor. Other boat companies in the town include Ellis Boat Company and Morris Yachts, both of which build, among other types, boats tailored for use in Maine and New England. MapsAlive, a software as a service company providing interactive maps and floor plans, is also located in Southwest Harbor.

The United States Coast Guard maintains a multipurpose facility in the town; USCGC Bridle is based there as well.

The Claremont Hotel, built in 1883, is listed on the National Register of Historic Places.

Notable people

 Myrna Fahey, actress
 Wendell Gilley, artist, bird carvings

In popular culture 

 Location filming for the 1999 television mini-series Storm of the Century took place in Southwest Harbor.
 The video for the song "Rebellion (Lies)" by Arcade Fire was filmed on High Road in downtown Southwest Harbor.
 In the novel Fudge-a-Mania by Judy Blume, the main character and his family spend their summer vacation at a house in Southwest Harbor, sharing it with his archenemy.
 It is a location in the Fallout 4, in the Far Harbor expansion pack.

Gallery

References

External links

 Official government website
 Chamber of Commerce website

Mount Desert Island
Towns in Hancock County, Maine
Towns in Maine
Populated coastal places in Maine